Skolastika Citra Kirana Wulan (born 5 June 1982) who is commonly known as Citra Scholastika is the youngest finalist from Indonesian Idol Season Six Remix. Her father is a worker at PT. Freeport Indonesia and her mother owns a bakery business. Before she managed to become a finalist on Indonesian Idol, Citra was eliminated in the workshop round III and came back through the Wild Card. Her interest in singing began at age four when she started singing at church contests. She is known for her distinctive vocal in jazz.

Singles
Everybody Knew (2011)
Pasti Bisa (2011)
Galau Galau Galau (2012)
Sampaikan (2012)
Berlian (2013)
Seruan Kebaikan endar (2013)
PertolonganMu (Christian song, maybe 2013)

Studio album
Pasti Bisa (September 2013)
Tuhan Melihat Hati (2014)
Love & Kiss (2015)

References

1994 births
English-language singers from Indonesia
Living people
Indonesian Roman Catholics
21st-century Indonesian women singers
Anugerah Musik Indonesia winners
Indonesian performers of Christian music